Cosmetics International is a British weekly beauty products trade magazine. The magazine was published by Communications International Group until January 2013 when it began to be published by HPCi Media Ltd.

The magazine claims to have been in print for over 30 years. The headquarters of Cosmetics International is in London.

References

Business magazines published in the United Kingdom
Weekly magazines published in the United Kingdom
Magazines published in London
Magazines with year of establishment missing
Professional and trade magazines
Cosmetic industry